The Houlu dialect is a dialect of Datian Min, which is often classified as a part of the Southern Min group of varieties of Chinese. It is spoken in northwestern Datian County, southwestern Youxi County, and several townships in Yong'an City and Sha County in the center of Fujian Province. In Youxi County, it is known as the Xinqiao dialect.  The main area where Houlu is spoken is northern Datian including Guangping, Jianshe, Qitao, Wenjiang, and Meishan, covering 22.45% of the population of Datian. The variety spoken in Guangping can be regarded as the representative. Although Houlu includes some features of Min Zhong and other Min languages, it is still not mutually intelligible with other Min Nan dialects.

Phonology 
In the Houlu dialect, there are 18 initials (not including the null initial), 41 rimes and 7 tones.

Initials

Rimes

Tones

Notes

References 
 
 

Southern Min